Michael Sserumaga (born 3 August 1989 in Kampala) is a Ugandan football player, who plays for SC Villa.

Career 
He began his career at Police Jinja before transferring in August 2007 to the youth side from Helsingborgs. He was promoted to the senior squad for the 2008 season. However during a training session with Ugandan club KB Lions he suffered a severe ankle injury that ruled him out for almost a year.

In September 2009, Sserumagga signed a one year contract with Uganda Revenue Authority SC to rehabilitate himself back to form and secure a return to Europe. Uganda’s Caf Champions League representatives Bunamwaya S.C. signed Sserumaga for a 6 month contract.

In February 2011, he joined the Rwandan side Rayon Sport.

International 
His debut for the Uganda national football team was on 8 June 2008 against Benin.

References

External links
 

1989 births
Living people
Sportspeople from Kampala
Ugandan footballers
Uganda international footballers
Ugandan expatriate footballers
Expatriate footballers in Sweden
Helsingborgs IF players
Association football forwards
Vipers SC players
Uganda Revenue Authority SC players
Saint George S.C. players
SC Victoria University players
Ugandan expatriate sportspeople in Sweden